Carnidae, also known as bird flies or filth flies, is a family of  flies (Diptera). There are 6 genera, containing about 93 species worldwide.

Description 
Carnidae in general are small (1–2 mm) black flies.

One feature of Carnidae is the frons of the head having some orbital setae medioclinate (pointing inwards) and others lateroclinate (pointing outwards). In Carnus, Hemeromyia, Meoneura and Enigmocarnus, the anterior two pairs of setae are medioclinate and the posterior two pairs are lateroclinate. In Neomeoneurites and the extinct genus Meoneurites, the anteriormost pair is medioclinate and the posterior three pairs are lateroclinate.

Ecology 
Most Carnidae are saprophagous. Adults have been found on dung, carrion, flowers of Apiaceae and other plants, in bird nests and sometimes in bird feathers. Larvae have been found in bird and mammal nests, damaged pupae of Sarcophaga sp. (Sarcophagidae), stems of Ferula sp. (Apiaceae), Leccinum fungus (Boletaceae), dung, salted fish and plant remains.

Adults of Carnus such as C. hemapterus and C. orientalis are exceptions, feeding on blood of birds. They are associated with bird nests and nestlings.

Genera
Carnus Nitzsch, 1818
Enigmocarnus Buck, 2007
Hemeromyia Coquillett, 1902
Meoneura Rondani, 1856
†Meoneurites Hennig, 1965
Neomeoneurites Hennig, 1972

External links
Dedicated site

References

 
Brachycera families
Wingless Diptera
Taxa named by Edward Newman